Tert.am ( /tert/ meaning “newspaper”) is a multi-genre news website providing coverage of the most important developments in Armenia, the Caucasus region, and worldwide. It was initially а media project of the Armenia-based limited liability company founded by Media Style. It is headquartered in Yerevan.

History
Tert.am was launched in 2008 and is available in three languages - Armenian, Russian and English. It is now the most popular website in Armenia in terms of the frequency of visits, citations and references  The website also has a video section.

News headlines are categorized into the following sections:

Armenia - domestic news and developments
Region - developments in the South Caucasus, Iran and Turkey
World - international developments
Business - business news in Armenia and around the globe
Science and technology - recent achievements in science, IT and HighTech, etc.
Culture - cultural news and developments in Armenia and around the globe
Lifestyle - entertainment news and interviews.

Positioning

Tert.am has always been a progressive media outlet inclined to innovative trends. It was the first news website in Armenia to introduce the multi-genre internet media format in 2008. It offers a coverage of local and regional news, as well as developments from around the world. Tert.am was also the first on Armenia's online media market to launch a mobile version in May 2010. Since May 2011, it has been operating its Android version for smart-phones and tablet computers. In the same period, the site became available to iPhones and iPads.

As of February 2014, the website attracts 150,000 visitors daily. In May 2014, it joined Pan-Armenian Media Group, a major media holding in Armenia. Since October 2015, the website has been operating the pages Tert.am Medicine and Tert.am Life. Both versions are available only in Armenian.

As of June 2016, Tert.am has about 30 employees.

See also

 Media in Armenia

References

External links

Armenian news websites
Armenian-language websites